Mäksa is a village in Kastre Parish, Tartu County in eastern Estonia.
Population: 7890 (2021)

References

Villages in Tartu County
Kreis Dorpat